Myrsine cheesemanii, known as the Cook Islands myrsine or ka‘ika makatea (in Mangaia), is a species of shrub within the family Myrsinaceae. It is endemic to the Cook Islands, growing on the islands of Rarotonga, Mangaia, Mauke and Mitiaro.

References

cheesemanii
Endemic flora of the Cook Islands